Mian Dido Jamwal was a Dogra Rajput warrior from the Jamwal clan who rebelled against the overlords of Jammu during the Sikh Empire of Ranjit Singh. He was descended from Raja Hari Dev of Jammu. Mian Dido was extremely popular among the common people of Jammu, and even today he is the subject of several ballads and legends. He is considered a hero and propagator of the regional identity of Jammu in political terms. He was killed by the troops of Gulab Singh after being surrounded.

Early life
According to oral tradition, Mian Dido was born in 1780, to Mian Hazara Singh (jagirdar of Jagti village) in Jagti village, Jammu. He was the descendant of Raja Hari Dev of Jammu after six generations, Raja Hari Dev was the common ancestor of both Mian Dido and Gulab Singh, the founder of the Dogra dynasty and the first ruler of Jammu and Kashmir princely state. Mian Hazara Singh started to train his son as a swordsman and archer right from his childhood.

Rebellion
In 1808, the Dogra rulers of Jammu were defeated in the Battle of Jammu against the Sikhs and Jammu came under the rule of Ranjit Singh, ruler of the Sikh Empire. Mian Dido was disturbed as he thought of the Sikh conquest as an insult to the dignity and prestige of the natives. Hence, he decided to organize the common people in a rebellion against Sikh authority. Mian Dido, along with his father Mian Hazara, were successful in raising the local peasants and zamindars against Sikh rule. The ballads on Mian Dido describe how the rebels damaged the integrity of Sikh rule in Jammu by plundering towns and villages, frustrating the tax collection process of the tax officials, robbing merchants and traders, murdering government servants and the zamindars refused to pay their dues.

The rebellion rapidly became popular as the common people viewed Mian Dido's rebellion as a fight for their honour and dignity. He became a figure somewhat similar to Robin Hood, a legendary outlaw of Europe. 
He regularly attacked the town of Jammu, which had a Sikh garrison of about 2,000 men, with varying numbers- 2,000 to 50-60 outlaws. Inspired by his victories, other social groups of Jammu such as the Chib Rajputs and Bhows flared up in revolt.
Several ballads were composed in praise of his deeds,one of which is given below:

Death
When all else failed, Ranjit Singh decided that an indigenous Dogra commander would be able to suppress the rebellion since he would be able to communicate with the natives, be aware of the culture and would know the terrain thoroughly. Hence, he sent Gulab Singh, a Dogra courtier at Lahore to crush the resistance of Mian Dido. Initially, Gulab Singh tried to convince Mian Dido to submit, he would be spared and given a high post in the Sikh court if he stopped the rebellion. However, the latter refused and then Gulab Singh tried to use his kinmanship with him (Raja Hari Dev of Jammu was their common ancestor) as a pretext to not fight. When negotiations failed, Gulab Singh cut off the food supplies of Mian Dido's men. The latter still refused to surrender, and Gulab Singh sent his troops under Attar Singh Kallol to surround the village of Jagti, the ancestral jagir of Mian Dido. Dido was not present there, however his father Mian Hazara Singh defended the village and was killed. Mian Dido fled to the Trikuta hills with his family. When they were surrounded by Sikh forces, Dido left his wife and two sons under the protection of a priest of the Vaishno Devi temple. At this juncture, legend says that he slew Attar Singh Kallol, who had killed his father, and with great composure, sat on a rock and started smoking his hookah. He was killed by a bullet from the Sikh soldiers from a distance.

See also
Gulab Singh
Jammu
Sikh Empire

References

1780 births
1821 deaths
Dogra people